Allegra Curtis (born July 11, 1966) is an American-born actress and businesswoman who has worked in English and German movies.

Personal life 
Curtis resides in Wilmington, North Carolina. She is the daughter of American actor Tony Curtis and Austrian-German actress Christine Kaufmann. She is the younger sister of Alexandra Curtis who is also an actress. Actresses Kelly and Jamie Lee Curtis are her paternal half-sisters. Her paternal grandparents were  Hungarian-Jewish immigrants.

After Christine Kaufmann's death in March 2017, Curtis announced in October 2017 that she would be continuing with her mother's cosmetics line.

References

External links

Living people
Actresses from Los Angeles
1966 births
Businesspeople from Los Angeles
American people of Hungarian-Jewish descent
Ich bin ein Star – Holt mich hier raus! participants
American people of German descent
American people of Austrian descent
21st-century American women